Maslyanye Gorochki is a rural locality (a village) in Nagornoye Rural Settlement, Petushinsky District, Vladimir Oblast, Russia. The population was 3 as of 2010. There are 3 streets.

Geography 
Maslyanye Gorochki is located 23 km northwest of Petushki (the district's administrative centre) by road. Aniskino is the nearest rural locality.

References 

Rural localities in Petushinsky District